In its vision of heresy, the Catholic Church makes a distinction between material and formal heresy. Material heresy means in effect "holding erroneous doctrines through no fault of one's own" due to inculpable ignorance and "is neither a crime nor a sin" since the individual has made the error in good faith. Formal heresy is "the wilful and persistent adherence to an error in matters of faith" on the part of a baptised person.  As such it is a grave sin and involves ipso facto excommunication; a Catholic that embraces a formal heresy is considered to have automatically separated his or her soul from the Catholic Church. Here "matters of faith" means dogmas which have been proposed by the infallible magisterium of the Church and, in addition to this intellectual error, "pertinacity in the will" in maintaining it in opposition to the teaching of the Church must be present.

Heresy has been a concern in Christian communities at least since the writing of the Second Epistle of Peter: "even as there shall be false teachers among you, who privily shall bring in damnable heresies, even denying the Lord that bought them" (2 Peter 2:1). In the first two or three centuries of the early Church, heresy and schism were not clearly distinguished. A similar overlapping occurred in medieval scholasticism. Heresy is understood today to mean the denial of revealed truth as taught by the Church. Nineteenth-century theologian Friedrich Schleiermacher defined it as "that which preserved the appearance of Christianity, and yet contradicted its essence". This article contains the movements and denominations which have been declared as heresy by the Catholic Church.

The following listing contains those opinions which were either explicitly condemned by Chalcedonian Christianity before 1054 or are of later origin but similar. Details of some modern opinions deemed to be heretical by the Catholic Church are listed in an appendix. All lists are in alphabetical order.

Early Christianity

Traditionally, orthodoxy and heresy have been viewed in relation to the "orthodoxy" as an authentic lineage of tradition. Other forms of Christianity were viewed as deviant streams of thought and therefore "heterodox", or heretical. This view was dominant until the publication of Walter Bauer's  ("Orthodoxy and heresy in ancient Christianity") in 1934. Bauer endeavored to rethink early Christianity historically, independent from the views of the church. He argued that originally unity was based on a common relationship with the same Lord rather than on formally defined doctrines and that a wide variety of views was tolerated. With time, some of these views were seen as inadequate. He went on to attribute the definition of "orthodoxy" to the increasing power and influence of the Church of Rome. In 1959, Henry Chadwick argued that all Christian communities were linked by the foundational events which occurred in Jerusalem and continued to be of defining importance in the forging of doctrinal orthodoxy. McGrath comments that historically Chadwick's account appears to be much the more plausible.

For convenience the heresies which arose in this period have been divided into three groups: Trinitarian/Christological; Gnostic; and other heresies.

Trinitarian/Christological heresies

The term Christology has two meanings in theology: it can be used in the narrow sense of the question as to how the divine and human are related in the person of Jesus Christ, or alternatively of the overall study of his life and work. Here it is used in the restricted, narrow sense.

The orthodox teaching concerning the Trinity, as finally developed and formally agreed at Constantinople in 381, is that God the Father, God the Son, and the Holy Spirit were all strictly one being in three hypostases, misleadingly translated as "persons". The christological question then arose as to how Jesus Christ could be both divine and human. This was formally resolved after much debate by the Ecumenical Councils of 431, 451 and 680 (Ephesus, Chalcedon & Constantinople III).

Gnosticism

Gnosticism refers to a diverse, syncretistic religious movement consisting of various belief systems generally united in the teaching that humans are divine souls trapped in a material world created by an imperfect god, the demiurge, who is frequently identified with the Abrahamic God. Gnosticism is a rejection (sometimes from an ascetic perspective) and vilification of the human body and of the material world or cosmos. Gnosticism teaches duality in Material (Matter) versus Spiritual or Body (evil) versus Soul (good). Gnosticism teaches that the natural or material world will and should be destroyed (total annihilation) by the true spiritual God in order to free mankind from the reign of the false God or Demiurge.

A common misperception is caused by the fact that, in the past, "Gnostic" had a similar meaning to current usage of the word mystic. There were some Orthodox Christians who as mystics (in the modern sense) taught gnosis (Knowledge of the God or the Good) who could be called gnostics in a positive sense (e.g. Diadochos of Photiki).

Whereas formerly Gnosticism was considered mostly a corruption of Christianity, it now seems clear that traces of Gnostic systems can be discerned some centuries before the Christian Era. Gnosticism may have been earlier than the 1st century, thus predating Jesus Christ. It spread through the Mediterranean and Middle East before and during the 2nd and 3rd centuries, becoming a dualistic heresy to Judaism (see Notzrim), Christianity and Hellenic philosophy in areas controlled by the Roman Empire and Arian Goths (see Huneric), and the Persian Empire. Conversion to Islam and the Albigensian Crusade (1209–1229) greatly reduced the remaining number of Gnostics throughout the Middle Ages, though a few isolated communities continue to exist to the present. Gnostic ideas became influential in the philosophies of various esoteric mystical movements of the late 19th and 20th centuries in Europe and North America, including some that explicitly identify themselves as revivals or even continuations of earlier gnostic groups.

Other Early Church heresies

Medieval heresies

Renaissance

Reformation

Sects declared to be heretical by the Catholic Church

Protestantism

Counter-Reformation movements

19th century

20th-century movements

See also

Christian heresy
Outline of Christianity
Outline of Catholicism
Outline of the Catholic ecumenical councils
Phyletism

References

Further reading 

 
 
 
 

Heresies

Catholic theology and doctrine